Lesbœufs is a commune in the Somme department in Hauts-de-France in northern France.

Geography

History
The village was named from a legend about the Scottish monk, Saint Furcy who came as an evangelist to Picardy. He died during a journey to Péronne, where he had wanted to visit a church that he'd ordered to be built. Several communes claimed his body for burial. After negotiations, it was decided that he would be buried at the place where the oxen (the beef), pulling his funeral cart, decided to stop. They pulled up at Péronne, where St Furcy became patron Saint.
The village where these negotiations took place was first called "Les Boeufs" then "Lesboeufs".

The little village has one feature of interest to outsiders, the Guards Cemetery. There are now 3,136 casualties of the First World War buried or commemorated in this cemetery which was designed by Sir Herbert Baker. Occupied by the Germans, Lesboeufs was attacked by the Guards Division on 15 September 1916 and captured eight days later. It was lost on 24 March 1918 during the German spring offensive and recaptured on 29 August by the 10th Bn, South Wales Borderers.

Population

Places of interest
 The church
 The Military cemetery - the "Guards' cemetery"

Personalities
 Saint Furcy - Patron saint of the neighbouring town of Péronne

See also
Communes of the Somme department

References

External links

 C.W.G site

Communes of Somme (department)
World War I sites in France